Brooklyn Community Board 16 is a New York City community board that encompasses the Brooklyn neighborhoods of  Brownsville and  Ocean Hill. It is delimited by East 98th street, East New York Avenue, Ralph Avenue, Atlantic Avenue and Saratoga Avenue on the west, Broadway on the north, Van Sinderen Avenue on the east, as well as by the Long Island Rail Road on the south.

Its current Chairperson is Genese Morgan, and its District Manager Viola D. Greene-Walker.  The Community Board #16's Office is located at 444 Thomas S. Boyland Street.

On a daily basis, the District Office staff monitors all complaints from community residents and works with the Mayor's Office, Borough President's Office, and City agencies to resolve local complaints; i.e., potholes, street light outages, water leaks, refuse collection, housing, heat and hot water complaints, demolition and seal-up of abandoned buildings, pest control, lot cleaning, human resources, and youth programs.  The staff also follows-up on the business of the Board and its committees.

The District Manager convenes a District Service Cabinet composed of all local service agency chiefs within the confines of Community District #16.  The Cabinet members interface with each other on specific projects in the district and follow up on individual complaints of the community. The Cabinet members provide invaluable assistance to the District Manager as it relates to the delivery of City services to the residents of Community District #16.

As of the United States Census, 2010, the Community Board has a population of 86,468, up from 85,343 in 2000 and 84,923 in 1990. 

Of them (as of 2010), 858 (1.0%) are White non Hispanic, 65,930 (76.2%) are African-American, 620 (0.7%) Asian or Pacific Islander, 287 (0.3%) American Indian or Native Alaskan, 280 (0.3%) of some other race, 1,124 (1.3%) of two or more race, 17,369 (20.1%) of Hispanic origins.  55.2% of the population benefited from public assistance in 2012, including 31.9% who receive Medicaid only.

References

External links
Profile of the Community Board (PDF)
Official website of the Community Board
Brooklyn neighborhood map

Community boards of Brooklyn